Giacomo Brichetto (born 9 May 1983) is an Italian professional footballer who plays as a goalkeeper for Ruggell.

Career
Brichetto was born in Genoa, and spent most of his career in the lower ranks of Italian professional football. He joined then-Serie C2 club Novara in 2007, and played as first choice keeper until January 2010, when he was signed by Serie A club Palermo in a loan exchange deal with Samir Ujkani. He was fully acquired by Palermo later in June, filling the role of third choice goalkeeper at the Sicilian side. Brichetto made his first appearance with a Palermo jersey on 13 December 2011, replacing injured Alexandros Tzorvas during the first half of a Coppa Italia game against Siena, then lost 4–7 on penalties (4–4 after extra time).

External links
 

1983 births
Footballers from Genoa
Living people
Italian footballers
U.S. Alessandria Calcio 1912 players
Novara F.C. players
A.S.D. Martina Calcio 1947 players
S.S.D. Sanremese Calcio players
Palermo F.C. players
Association football goalkeepers
Serie A players
Serie C players
Italian expatriate footballers
Expatriate footballers in Liechtenstein